Frederick Ehlen (September 12, 1851 - November 15, 1934) was a Major League Baseball right fielder who played in one game for the Baltimore Marylands on April 14, .

External links

Retrosheet

Baltimore Marylands players
Major League Baseball right fielders
19th-century baseball players
1851 births
1934 deaths